Jalovec is a village and municipality in Liptovský Mikuláš District in the Žilina Region of northern Slovakia.

History
In historical records the village was first mentioned in 1391.

Geography
The municipality lies at an altitude of 686 metres and covers an area of 20.179 km². It has a population of about 322 people.

Genealogical resources

The records for genealogical research are available at the state archive "Statny Archiv in Bytca, Slovakia"

 Roman Catholic church records (births/marriages/deaths): 1732-1900 (parish B)
 Lutheran church records (births/marriages/deaths): 1868-1895 (parish B)

See also
 List of municipalities and towns in Slovakia

External links
https://web.archive.org/web/20071027094149/http://www.statistics.sk/mosmis/eng/run.html
 Village website (in Slovak)
Surnames of living people in Jalovec

Villages and municipalities in Liptovský Mikuláš District